Sir Hervey Smythe (1734-1811) was a British army officer and a topographical painter. He fought alongside James Wolfe during the Gulf of St. Lawrence Campaign (1758) and is pictured holding his right arm in the historic Benjamin West's painting The Death of General Wolfe. Hervey made his own portrait of Wolfe at Quebec.

References

External links 
 

British military personnel of the French and Indian War
Baronets in the Baronetage of Great Britain
1734 births
1811 deaths